The Princess  is a 1983 (or 1981) Hungarian drama film directed by Pál Erdöss. It won the Caméra d'Or at the 1983 Cannes Film Festival, and the Golden Leopard at the 1983 Locarno International Film Festival.

Cast 
 Erika Ozsda as Jutka  
 Andrea Szendrei as Zsuzsa  
 Denes Diczhazi as Peter  
 Árpád Tóth as Andras 
 Júlia Nyakó as Zsuzsa nõvére 
 Lajos Soltis as Kamionos

References

External links 
 

1983 films
1983 drama films
1980s Hungarian-language films
Hungarian drama films
Caméra d'Or winners
Golden Leopard winners
1983 directorial debut films
Films set in Budapest